The first season of Salem, an American horror–drama television series on WGN America, premiered on April 20, 2014, and concluded on July 13, 2014, consisting of thirteen episodes. Created for television by Adam Simon and Brannon Braga, who write or co-write episodes of the show, the series is based on the Salem Witch Trials. It was executive produced by Braga, Coby Greenberg and David Von Ancken, with Braga and Simon assuming the role of showrunner.

As the first original scripted show on WGN America, the pilot episode received 1.52 million viewers, and remained the network's highest-rated show throughout its first season run. The show was soon renewed for a second season.  The season follows Mary Sibley, a witch conspiring with other witches to bring forth the Grand Rite, as she brings forth hysteria among the puritans of Salem. Her former flame, John Alden, returns after years of absence, complicating her wicked plan.

Cast

Main cast 
 Janet Montgomery as Mary Walcott, Salem's most powerful enchantress (13 episodes)
 Shane West as Captain John Alden, Mary's love interest (13 episodes)
 Seth Gabel as Cotton Mather, the local witch hunter (13 episodes)
 Ashley Madekwe as Tituba, Mary's friend and fellow witch (10 episodes)
 Tamzin Merchant as Anne Hale, the daughter of the Magistrate (13 episodes)
 Elise Eberle as Mercy Lewis, a tortured victim from the witches (12 episodes)
 Xander Berkeley as Magistrate John Hale, the father of Anne (13 episodes)
 Iddo Goldberg as Isaac Walton, branded the fornicator (9 episodes)

Recurring cast
 Lara Grice as Mrs. Hale, the mother of Anne and wife of John Hale (10 episodes)
 Michael Mulheren as George Sibley, the elected official of Salem (9 episodes)
 Azure Parsons as Gloriana Embry, Cotton's love interest later banished by Increase (7 episodes)
 Stephen Lang as Increase Mather, Cotton's father who takes over the witch hunt (7 episodes)
 Morgana Shaw as Mab, the madam of the local brothel (7 episodes)
 Mary Katherine O'Donnell as Emily Hopkins (7 episodes)
 Sammi Hanratty as Dollie Trask, Mercy's best friend (5 episodes)
 Christopher Berry as The Seer, a man who lives in the woods (5 episodes)
 Lucy Faust as Elizabeth (5 episodes)
 Diane Louise Salinger as Rose Browning, a fellow witch (4 episodes)
 Thomas Francis Murphy as Reverend Lewis, the local priest (4 episodes)

Guest cast
 Antonia Prebble as Bridget Bishop, a midwife accused of witchcraft (1 episode)
 Kevin Tighe as Giles Corey, has close ties to the Alden family (1 episode)

Production

Writing

Episodes

Reception

Critical response 
The first season of Salem received mixed reviews from critics, earning a 54% on Rotten Tomatoes based on 26 reviews, with the site's critical consensus reading: "While the horror scenes are well-executed, Salem lacks enough substance to sustain even a guilty-pleasure interest."

Accolades

Ratings 
The series premiere on April 20, 2014 garnered 1.5 million viewers and 647,000 Adults 18-49, which was a 635% increase over WGN America's season-to-date average in that timeslot. Including the other three airings that night, Salem had a cumulative 2.3 million viewers and 886,000 Adults 18-49. The premiere was also WGN America's highest rated telecast since 2007. In Live+3 DVR ratings, Salem rose to 3.1 million total viewers, and 1.3 million Adults 18-49, which was WGN America's best 18-49 performance since December 2003, and best performance in total viewers since December 2001. 

The premiere averaged 3.4 million viewers and 1.5 million Adults 18-49 in Live+7 ratings, and the first two episodes averaged in 1.7 million viewers and 806,000 Adults 18-49 in the Live+7's. As a result, the show was renewed for a second season on May 5, 2014 after airing only 3 episodes. The season as a whole averaged a 0.22 18-49 rating and a 0.28 25-54 rating. It also averaged approximately 159,000 Females 18-49 and 126,000 Males 18-49 over the course of the season.

Home media releases 

The first season was released on DVD in the United States on October 28, 2014 by Fox Home Entertainment.

References

External links 

 
 

2014 American television seasons